Hymenocardia is a genus of trees in the family Phyllanthaceae first described as a genus in 1836. Most of the species are native to Africa, with one in Southeast Asia.

Species in this genus are dioecious, with male and female flowers on separate plants.

Species

formerly included
moved to Mallotus 
Hymenocardia plicata - Mallotus plicatus

References

External links

Phyllanthaceae
Phyllanthaceae genera
Dioecious plants